Daniel-Kofi Kyereh (born 8 March 1996) is a Ghanaian professional footballer who plays as a forward for SC Freiburg and the Ghana national team.

Club career

Wehen Wiesbaden
On 6 June 2018, Kyereh signed with 3. Liga club, Wehen Wiesbaden. He helped Wehen secure promotion to the 2. Bundesliga with a goal in a 3–1 victory over Ingolstadt in a relegation match in May 2019. Following the club's relegation in the 2019–20 season, Kyereh was released on 30 June 2020.

FC St. Pauli
In July 2020, Kyereh signed a three-year contract with FC St. Pauli. In his first game in 2020 he scored two late goals to secure a point.

SC Freiburg
On 27 June 2022, Kyereh signed with Bundesliga side SC Freiburg. He scored his first competitive goal for Freiburg in a league match against Mainz on 1 October 2022. Five days later, he scored his first goal in European football in a 2–0 win over FC Nantes in the group stage of the Europa League.

International career
Kyereh was born in Ghana to a German mother and Ghanaian father, and moved to Germany at the age of 1. He debuted for the Ghana national team in a 1–0 2022 FIFA World Cup qualification win over Ethiopia on 3 September 2021.

On 14 November 2022, Ghana manager Otto Addo selected Kyereh as part of the final squad to represent the nation at the 2022 FIFA World Cup in Qatar. He featured as a second-half substitute in all three matches as the Black Stars were eliminated in the group stage.

Career statistics

Club

Honours
Wehen Wiesbaden
 Hessian Cup: 2018–19

References

External links
 

1996 births
Living people
Ghanaian people of German descent
German sportspeople of Ghanaian descent
Footballers from Accra
Ghanaian footballers
German footballers
Association football midfielders
Ghana international footballers
2021 Africa Cup of Nations players
Bundesliga players
2. Bundesliga players
3. Liga players
Regionalliga players
TSV Havelse players
SV Wehen Wiesbaden players
FC St. Pauli players
SC Freiburg players
2022 FIFA World Cup players